Callipogon barbatum is a species of flat-faced longhorn beetle in the subfamily Prioninae of the family Cerambycidae.

Description
Head and pronotum are black, covered with white-yellowish hairs. Elytra are reddish-brown or light brown with a reddish tinge. The males have well developed mandibles, with long light brown and red hairs. The mandibles of females are much shorter than the in males.

Distribution
This species occurs from Mexico through Central America to Panama.

References
  Biolib

External links
  barbatus Cerambycoidea
  Whatsthatbug

Prioninae
Beetles described in 1775
Taxa named by Johan Christian Fabricius